Thomas Herbert may refer to:

 Thomas Herbert (seaman) (1597–1642?), Welsh seaman and author
 Sir Thomas Herbert, 1st Baronet (1606–1682), traveller and historian
 Thomas Herbert, 8th Earl of Pembroke (c. 1656–1733), statesman and President of the Royal Society, MP for Wilton 1679–1683
 Thomas Herbert (Newport MP) (c.1695–1739), British army officer and politician, MP for NewportCornwall 1726–1739
 Thomas Herbert (Royal Navy officer) (1793–1861), British naval officer
 Thomas Arnold Herbert (1863–1940), Member of Parliament for Wycombe, 1906–1910
 Thomas J. Herbert (1894–1974), Governor of Ohio
 Thomas M. Herbert (1927–2014), judge from Ohio
 Thomas Herbert (MP for Monmouthshire), see Monmouthshire (UK Parliament constituency)